The Crosby CR-4 is a racing aircraft developed in the late 1930s

Development
The Crosby CR-4 is the follow-on of the Menasco C6S-4 powered Crosby CR-3 (a.k.a. C6R-3) designed to be powered by a twelve-cylinder Ranger V-770 engine The aircraft was designed while Crosby was recovering with a broken back and fractured skull from the 1936 crash of his all metal CR-3. Despite a prior failure causing a crash, money shortages prompted Crosby to reuse the Menasco C6S-4 engine from his former racer. Funding for construction came from fellow racer Kieth Rider. Students from the Curtiss-Wright Technical Institute in Glendale, California assembled the aircraft.

Design
The CR-4 is a low-wing monoplane with conventional landing gear. The construction is all-metal stressed skin.  The triangular wings featured a straight leading edge with a long chord tapering to a point at the wingtips. The left cowling held a combination oil tank and surface cooler. The seat and canopy adjusted up six inched in travel for take off and landing visibility. The landing gear used compressed air from a Lux air bottle rather than mechanical or hydraulic mechanism. Copper filings found later in the line, combined with wind resistance prevented one leg from locking.

Operational history
The first flight was performed in April 1938 at Mines Field with severe aileron flutter and a wheel collapse on landing.

1938 Greve races. Crosby landed while on fire in the 14th lap from an engine manifold that fell off in flight.
1938 Thompson Trophy races. The CR-4 was repaired just in time for the race but landed with fuel leakage problems.
1939 Greve races. Crosby's landing gear failed to retract from a leaking compressed air tank. Crosby landed after 14 laps with a third-place finish.
1939 Thompson Trophy. Crosby finished fourth with engine troubles.

In late 1939, the CR-4 was filmed for use in the movie Tail Spin. In 1945, Crosby died while bailing out of a XP-79B. The CR-4 was sold by his wife to be restored by its new owner. The aircraft was placed in storage in a school bus until purchased by Morton Lester. Lester donated the airframe to the EAA Airventure museum in Oshkosh, Wisconsin, where it was restored and placed on display.

Variants
Crosby CIP-5 - With the onset of WWII, Crosby developed an all wood interceptor around the CR-4 design and its intended Twelve cylinder Ranger engine. Construction material was wood rather than the advanced all-metal design of the prior racers.

Specifications (CR-4)

References

Racing aircraft
Low-wing aircraft
Single-engined tractor aircraft
Aircraft first flown in 1938